Gennady Belyakov (born June 7, 1968 in Moscow)  is a Soviet luger who competed in the late 1980s to 1990. He won the bronze medal in the mixed team event at the 1990 FIL World Luge Championships in Calgary, Alberta, Canada.

References
Hickok sports information on World champions in luge and skeleton.

External links
 

Living people
Russian male lugers
Soviet male lugers
1968 births
Lugers at the 1992 Winter Olympics
Lugers at the 1994 Winter Olympics
Olympic lugers of Russia
Olympic lugers of the Unified Team